Galmpton is a small hamlet near Thurlestone, Devon, England. It is in the South Hams district and is five miles west of Salcombe. In 1870-72 Galmpton had a population of 176 as recorded in the Imperial Gazetteer of England and Wales. Galmpton was recorded in the Domesday Book as Walementone/Walenimtona

References 

Hamlets in Devon
Villages in South Hams
South Huish